Sceptrulophora (from Ancient Greek, σκῆπτρον, skêptron - "sceptre" and -φόρος, -phóros - "bearing") is an order of hexactinellid sponges, commonly known as Glass sponges, characterized by sceptrule spicules, that is, "microscleric monactinal triaxonic spicules that include clavules with terminel umbels or smooth heads." Species of the order Sceptrulophora have existed since the Jurassic period, and still flourish today. While there is ongoing debate about the organization of various taxa in Sceptrulophora, the monophyly of the taxon Sceptrulophora is supported by the presence of sceptrules in most of the extant species, and has recently been further supported by DNA sequencing.

Families
Aphrocallistidae Gray, 1867
 Auloplacidae Schrammen, 1912
 Craticulariidae Rauff, 1893
 Cribrospongiidae Roemer, 1864
 Euretidae Zittel, 1877
 Farreidae Gray, 1872
 Fieldingiidae Tabachnick & Janussen, 2004
 Tretodictyidae Schulze, 1886
Uncinateridae Reiswig, 2002

References

Hexactinellida
Sponge orders